Ahmad Ali Heydari (born 1963) (Persian: احمدعلی حیدری) is an Iranian philosopher and associate professor of philosophy at Allameh Tabataba'i University known for his works on ethics and his research on the reception of Western philosophy by Iranian thinkers. He received his PhD in philosophy from University of Bonn in 2003. Heydari is a member of board of directors of Iranian Society of Intercultural Philosophy (ISIPH).

Bibliography
 Wegbereiter der iranischen Moderne: Eine philosophische Analyse ihrer Befürworter und Gegner, SVH, 2010
 Perspectives on the thought of "Professor Rizvok Ehashi" and Intercultural Philosophy in Japan, Tehran: Allameh Tabatabaei University Press, 2016

Translations
 Ethik für junge Menschen, José Galindo and Héctor Zagal, Tehran: Hekmat
 Vorlesungen über Ethik, Ernst Tugendhat, Tehran: University of Tehran Press
 Martin Heidegger: Sein und Zeit, Andreas Luckner, Tehran: Elmi
 Knowledge and Faith: Collected Essays, Jürgen Habermas, Tehran: University of Tehran Press

See also 
Iranian philosophy

Sources

External links
 Heydari at Allameh Tabataba'i University

1963 births
Living people
University of Tehran alumni
Heidegger scholars
Philosophy academics
Existentialists
Hermeneutists
21st-century Iranian philosophers
Philosophers of culture
Continental philosophers
Phenomenologists
Academic staff of Allameh Tabataba'i University
University of Bonn alumni
People from Kerman Province
Faculty of Letters and Humanities of the University of Tehran alumni